Roy Ellam (February 8, 1886 – October 28, 1948), nicknamed "Slippery", was a professional baseball player.  He was a shortstop for parts of two seasons (1909, 1918) with the Cincinnati Reds and Pittsburgh Pirates.  For his career, he compiled a .143 batting average, with one home run and six runs batted in.

He was born in Conshohocken, Pennsylvania, and died there at the age of 62.

External links

1886 births
1948 deaths
People from Conshohocken, Pennsylvania
Cincinnati Reds players
Pittsburgh Pirates players
Major League Baseball shortstops
Baseball players from Pennsylvania
Atlanta Crackers managers
Minor league baseball managers
Birmingham Barons players
Nashville Vols players
Indianapolis Indians players
Galveston Pirates players
Mobile Bears players
Montgomery Lions players
Sportspeople from Montgomery County, Pennsylvania